Braindead (also known as Dead Alive in North America) is a 1992 New Zealand zombie comedy Splatter film directed by Peter Jackson, produced by Jim Booth, and written by Jackson, along with Fran Walsh and Stephen Sinclair. It stars Timothy Balme, Diana Peñalver, Elizabeth Moody and Ian Watkin. The plot follows Lionel, a young man living in South Wellington with his strict mother Vera. After Lionel becomes romantically entangled with a girl named Paquita, Vera is bitten by a hybrid rat-monkey creature and begins  to transform into a zombie, while also infecting swathes of the city's populace.

Made on a budget of $3 million, Braindead was Jackson's most expensive film up to that point. Although it received positive reviews from critics, it was a box office bomb. It has since received a cult following, and is now widely regarded as one of the goriest films of all time.

Plot
In 1957, zoo official Stewart McAlden and his team smuggle a captured Sumatran rat-monkey, a hybrid creature that resulted from the rape of tree monkeys by plague-carrying rats, out of Skull Island. During the team's escape from the island's warrior natives, who demand the return of the creature, Stewart is bitten by the rat-monkey, resulting in his dismemberment and killing by his crew, who fear the effects of the bite. As per Stewart's warning to the natives, "this monkey's going to Newtown", the captured rat-monkey is then shipped to Wellington Zoo by the survivors of the expedition.

In Wellington, Lionel Cosgrove lives in Hataitai in a Victorian mansion with his domineering mother Vera. When he was a child, Lionel's father drowned trying to save him at the beach, and the incident has haunted him into adulthood. To Vera's dismay, Lionel falls in love with a Spanish Romani shopkeeper's daughter, Paquita María Sánchez, who is convinced the two are destined to be together. When the two visit the Wellington zoo together on a date, Vera follows them and is bitten by the rat-monkey, killing the animal in the process. Over the following days, she grows increasingly more decrepit; her skin begins to peel and her ear falls off during lunch with friends. She appears to die before reanimating as a ravenous zombie and killing the attending nurse Mrs. McTavish, who also returns as a zombie, before Lionel locks them both in the basement and keeps them sedated with animal tranquilizers. While visiting Paquita, Lionel is given a pendant for luck by her grandmother. Vera is able to break out of the basement and is ran over into Paquita's shop by a tram, but Lionel tranquilizes Vera before she attacks them.

At her funeral, Lionel tranquilizes Vera to keep her from attacking the mourners. Later, while returning to the graveyard to administer more of it, he is accosted and beaten by a group of hoodlums who presume him to be a necrophiliac. Vera suddenly bursts from her grave and attacks the hoodlums. In the ensuing commotion, the gang leader "Void", as well as the local priest Father McGruder, are bitten and become zombies, so Lionel has to keep them locked in the basement too. After the nurse and priest copulate and produce a zombie baby, Lionel breaks up with Paquita to keep her safe. Shortly afterward, Lionel's uncle Les arrives to wrangle with Lionel over Vera's estate. Discovering the zombies, which he believes to be dead bodies, in the basement, Les blackmails his nephew into giving up the house and his inheritance and invites his friends over for a housewarming party despite Lionel's objections.

During the party, Paquita arrives to try to make amends with Lionel. She discovers the zombies in the basement, and Lionel explains to her all that has occurred. She is able to convince Lionel to administer poison to the zombies to finally kill them, but after injecting the zombies with it, he discovers the poison is animal stimulants, which revives them. They narrowly escape the now-enhanced zombies, who burst into the house upstairs and slaughter the party guests. The guests subsequently reanimate and begin to attack the survivors. Lionel enters the house with a lawnmower and proceeds to mow through a horde of zombies, while Paquita tries to dispose of zombie body parts in the blender. Les enters the basement, where he is beheaded by Vera, who has now grown to monstrous proportions. Vera erupts from the basement and pursues them both to the rooftop as the house catches fire from a burst gas pipe.

As Vera corners them on the roof, Lionel confronts his mother and reveals that he witnessed Vera drowning his father and his lover in the bathtub as a child, and proclaims that he is no longer afraid of her. Vera becomes enraged and swallows Lionel with an opening in her stomach before trying to kill Paquita. Lionel cuts his way out of his mother's body with the good luck pendant, causing Vera to fall back into the burning house. Lionel and Paquita escape the burning rooftop as the fire brigade arrives. They kiss and then walk away arm-in-arm.

Cast

Production
Principal photography took place over eleven weeks on location in and around Wellington on a reported budget of around $3 million. The film had its origins while Jackson was filming his feature film debut, Bad Taste (1987). He met with writers Fran Walsh and Stephen Sinclair, who were also interested in creating a zombie film, and the three spent the next several years conceiving the project. The film was shot on Super 16mm, as opposed to 35mm, so that more of the budget could be spent on effects. The film's special effects were crafted by Bob McCarron and Richard Taylor, with some miniature models being created by Jackson himself. For the film's climactic scene, wherein Lionel massacres a horde of zombies with a lawnmower, a reputed 300 litres (79.2 gallons) of fake blood was used.

The film's music was composed by Peter Dasent.

The film was subject to a lawsuit after release. In Bradley v WingNut Films Ltd [1993] 1 NZLR 415, it was alleged that Braindead had infringed the privacy of the plaintiffs by containing pictures of the plaintiff's family tombstone. After reviewing the New Zealand judicial authorities on privacy, Gallen J stated: "the present situation in New Zealand ... is that there are three strong statements in the High Court in favour of the existence of such a tort in this country and an acceptance by the Court of Appeal that the concept is at least arguable."  This case became one of a series of cases which contributed to the introduction of tort invasions of privacy in New Zealand.

Filming locations

The film was mostly shot in and around Wellington's southern and western suburbs. Some filming locations include:
 Putangirua Pinnacles acts as Skull Island in the film.
 Wellington Zoo, Newtown.
 No. 12 Hinau Road, Hataitai, Wellington is Lionel's house in the movie.
 Karori Cemetery, Wellington.
 The store where Lionel and Paquita first meet at 29 Sutherland Rd, Melrose, Wellington, on the corner of Rodrigo Road and Sutherland Road.
 The park used in the scene with Lionel and Selwyn was filmed in the children's play area of the Wellington Botanical Gardens.
 A Fieldair Freight DC-3 lands at Wellington International Airport.
 Queens Drive, Lyall Bay, Wellington.
 Lionel goes to the veterinary clinic on located on 20 Standen St, Karori, Wellington.

Release
Braindead released on 13 August 1992 in New Zealand. It was subsequently released in the United States on 12 February 1993 under the title Dead Alive and grossed $23,765 in its opening weekend. It eventually grossed $242,623 in the country. The soundtrack was released in 1992 by Mana Music.

The film has had several releases on VHS, Laserdisc, and DVD around the world. It was first released on Blu-ray as Dead Alive by Lionsgate in October 2011, with the US 97-minute cut.

In December 2018, Peter Jackson announced that he plans to restore Braindead, along with his previous films Bad Taste and Meet the Feebles for a possible 4K release.

Alternate versions 
The film was released in a number of different versions. In some nations, such as the United Kingdom and Australia, the 104-minute film was shown in full. In fact, the UK's British Board of Film Classification (BBFC) found the film's gory content so light-hearted and comical that there was consideration on giving the film a 15 certificate, which would have granted it to be seen by a much younger audience. They ultimately decided to give the film an 18 rating because the amount of gore confounded the expectations of a 15 rating.

In countries where the censors balked at the extreme gore, the film was initially banned or left unrated before being heavily cut. In Germany, a 94-minute version was seen with major cuts to some of the film's grislier scenes but was widely ignored. A FSK 16 rated version was released in Germany under the American title Dead Alive, omitting almost the entirety of the violence. The uncut version, as well as several cut versions, are banned in Germany. It is also illegal to publicly exhibit the film in Germany. The gory violence has also caused the film to be banned in South Korea, Singapore and Finland. However, the film was unbanned and released uncut in the latter country in 2001.

In the United States, the film was released as Dead Alive, because of another film with rights to the practically identical title Brain Dead. There were two versions released in the country; the unrated cut is 97 minutes, and the R-rated version is only 85 minutes with many of the gore scenes removed.

Critical reception
The site's critical consensus reads, "The delightfully gonzo tale of a lovestruck teen and his zombified mother, Dead Alive is extremely gory and exceedingly good fun, thanks to Peter Jackson's affection for the tastelessly sublime." Metacritic rated it 54 out of 100 based on 7 reviews, indicating "mixed or average reviews".

At the time of its release, David Stratton, writing for Variety, gave a positive review, calling it "Jackson's best film to date" and praising its humour, acting, and technical qualities (gore effects, makeup). He stated "Kiwi gore specialist Peter Jackson, who goes for broke with an orgy of bad taste and splatter humor. Some will recoil from the gore, but Braindead wasn't made for them." Peter Rainer of the Los Angeles Times enjoyed the film, stating that it "is the most hilariously disgusting movie ever made. It makes something like Re-Animator seem like a UNESCO documentary about Mother Teresa." The film received a negative review from The Independent writer Quentin Curtis, who complained that "it never decides whether to make you tremble with laughter or fear, and has outstayed its welcome long before the last limb has been severed and entrail spilled." For Entertainment Weekly, Owen Gleiberman wrote that the film was "breezy and good-natured", giving praise to the gore special effects.

Retrospective reception was also positive. Braindead placed at number 91 in a top 100 list produced by Time Out magazine after conducting a poll with several authors, directors, actors and critics who have worked within the horror genre. Simon Pegg, actor, comedian, and friend of Jackson, wrote in his autobiography Nerd Do Well: A Small Boy's Journey to Becoming a Big Kid that Braindead is one of the main influences on his 2004 zombie film Shaun of the Dead.

Accolades

See also
 1992 in film
 Giant Rat of Sumatra

References

External links

 
 
 
 
 

1992 films
1992 comedy films
1992 horror films
1990s black comedy films
1990s comedy horror films
1990s English-language films
1990s exploitation films
1990s monster movies
1990s New Zealand films
New Zealand black comedy films
New Zealand comedy horror films
New Zealand slapstick films
New Zealand splatter films
New Zealand zombie films
Film censorship in Germany
Film censorship in the United Kingdom
Film controversies in Germany
Film controversies in the United Kingdom
Films about dysfunctional families
Films directed by Peter Jackson
Films set in 1957
Films set in New Zealand
Films set in Sumatra
Films shot in New Zealand
Films using stop-motion animation
Films with screenplays by Fran Walsh
Films with screenplays by Peter Jackson
Films with screenplays by Stephen Sinclair
Rating controversies in film
Splatterpunk
Trimark Pictures films
Wellington in fiction
WingNut Films films
Zombie comedy films